Harvey Campbell (born c. 1940) is a former Canadian football player who played for the Saskatchewan Roughriders.

References

Living people
1940s births
Place of birth missing (living people)
Canadian football guards
Saskatchewan Roughriders players